Micah Hawkins (January 1, 1777 – July 29, 1825) was an American poet, playwright, and composer, largely of music for theater, who also operated a New York City tavern and grocery store.

He was born in Head of the Harbor, New York and moved to New York City in 1798, where he worked in several jobs, including carriage-maker, before opening a grocery and inn. He played flute, piano, and violin.

His blackface song "Backside Albany", ridiculing the British during the War of 1812 was to be sung "in the character of a Negro sailor", ridiculing the British efforts. It was  first performed in Albany, New York, February 15, 1815, as part of a play, The Battle of Plattsburgh.

His operetta The Saw-Mill, or A Yankee Trick, the first opera by an American composer on an American theme, had six performances at New York's Chatham Garden Theatre in 1824–25.

Hawkins was the uncle of painter William Sidney Mount, who lived with him for a time in childhood.

References

 The Riches of Sight: William Sidney Mount and His World
 The Battle of Plattsburgh: Songs and Tunes of 1814
 Our Heritage: The World of William S. Mount (Word doc), from the Long Island Museum.
 Peter Goodman, A Real Yankee First, from New York Newsday's Long Island history site.

1777 births
1825 deaths
American grocers
People from Smithtown, New York
Musicians from New York City
Businesspeople from New York City
Writers from New York City
Songwriters from New York (state)
Poets from New York (state)
Blackface minstrel songwriters
18th-century American composers
18th-century American musicians
18th-century male musicians
19th-century American composers
18th-century American poets
18th-century American male writers
19th-century American poets
18th-century American dramatists and playwrights
19th-century American dramatists and playwrights
19th-century American businesspeople
American male songwriters
American male poets
American male dramatists and playwrights
19th-century American male writers
19th-century American male musicians
American operetta composers
Male operetta composers